The Le Mayeur Museum is a museum containing Adrien-Jean Le Mayeur's work as well as his collection of traditional Balinese art and local artifacts. It is located in Sanur, Bali, Indonesia.

Literature

See also
List of single-artist museums

External links 
 Baliblog | Le Mayeur Museum

Denpasar
Museums in Bali
Art museums and galleries in Indonesia
Museums devoted to one artist